Józef Pisarski (15 June 1913 – 8 December 1986) was a Polish boxer who competed in the 1936 Summer Olympics.

He was born and died in Łódź.

In 1936 he was eliminated in the first round of the welterweight class after losing his fight to Leonard Cook.

External links
profile 

1913 births
1986 deaths
Sportspeople from Łódź
People from Piotrków Governorate
Welterweight boxers
Olympic boxers of Poland
Boxers at the 1936 Summer Olympics
Polish male boxers
Members of the Polish Gymnastic Society "Sokół"
20th-century Polish people